The Sispara day gecko (Cnemaspis sisparensis) is a species of gecko found in the Nilgiri Hills of India.

Description
It is closely allied to Cnemaspis wynadensis, but the digits much more elongate. Three femoral pores are found on each side. The dorsal tubercles are homogeneous. In color, it is brown, with regular, transverse, dark bands across the body and tail.

From snout to vent, it grows to 2.4 in.

Its type locality is Sholakal, near the bottom of the Sispara Ghat, Nilgiri Hills.

References

 Annandale, N. (1915). Herpetological notes and descriptions. Records of the Indian Museum, 11:341-347
 Beddome, R.H. (1870). Descriptions of new reptiles from the Madras Presidency. Madras Monthly J. Med. Sci. 2:169-176 [Reprint.: J. Soc. Bibliogr. Nat. Sci., London, 1 (10): 327–334, 1940]
 Boulenger, G.A. (1885). Catalogue of the Lizards in the British Museum (Nat. Hist.) I. Geckonidae, Eublepharidae, Uroplatidae, Pygopodidae, Agamidae. London: 450 pp.
 Theobald, W. (1876). Descriptive catalogue of the reptiles of British India. Thacker, Spink & Co., Calcutta: xiii + 238 pp.

Cnemaspis
Reptiles described in 1870